Swiss Suite is a live album by American jazz composer/arranger Oliver Nelson featuring performances by a big band with soloists Gato Barbieri (tenor sax) and Eddie "Cleanhead" Vinson (alto sax). The album was recorded at the Montreux Jazz Festival in 1971 for the Flying Dutchman label.

Reception

The Allmusic site awarded the album 3 stars stating "it is the nearly 27-minute "Swiss Suite" that dominates this album and although tenorman Gato Barbieri has a couple of raging solos, it is a five-minute segment when guest altoist Eddie "Cleanhead" Vinson plays the blues that is most memorable. Vinson's classic spot alone is worth the price of this hard-to-find LP.".

Track listing
All compositions by Oliver Nelson
 "Swiss Suite" - 26:53
 "Stolen Moments" - 8:38
 "Black, Brown and Beautiful" - 3:15
 "Blues and the Abstract Truth" - 6:03

Personnel
Oliver Nelson - alto saxophone, arranger, conductor
Charles Tolliver - trumpet, flugelhorn
Danny Moore, Rich Cole, Bernt Stean, Harry Beckett - trumpet
Buddy Baker, Bertil Strandberg, Donald Beightol, C.J. Shibley, Monte Holz, John Thomas - trombone
Jim Nissen - bass trombone
Eddie "Cleanhead" Vinson (track 1), Jesper Thilo, Ozren Depolo - alto saxophone
Gato Barbieri (track 1), Michael Urbaniak, Bob Sydor - tenor saxophone
Steve Stevenson - baritone saxophone
Stanley Cowell - piano
Victor Gaskin, Hugo Rasmussen - bass
Bernard Purdie- drums
Bosko Petrovic - drums, vibraphone, tarabooka
Na Na - berimbau
Sonny Morgan - congas

References

1972 live albums
Albums arranged by Oliver Nelson
Albums conducted by Oliver Nelson
Albums produced by Bob Thiele
Flying Dutchman Records live albums
Oliver Nelson live albums
Albums recorded at the Montreux Jazz Festival